Tarnania is a genus of flies belonging to the family Mycetophilidae.

The species of this genus are found in Eurasia and Northern America.

Species:
 Tarnania dziedzickii (Edwards, 1941) 
 Tarnania fenestralis (Meigen, 1818)

References

Mycetophilidae